The Face is a modeling-themed reality television series that follows three supermodel coaches as they compete with each other to find 'the face' of major brand. The inaugural series premiered online on February 1, 2013 and officially premiered on television on February 12, 2013, on Oxygen. The series is now an international franchise, owning its adaptations around the world. Naomi Campbell serves as a supermodel coach and also executive producer and chooses supermodel mentors for the American, British and Australian adaptations.

Format
In each series of The Face three model mentors select a team of models whose assets they believe will allow them to win the competition. Each week, the models participate in an overall challenge. This challenge ignores team division, and whoever wins the challenge does so individually. The next segment involves a campaign or client. The models perform for these clients in a wide variety of shoots, commercials, or runway shows. These campaigns are performed in the teams that were assigned at the beginning of the series. Each mentor supervises the group she chose as they perform. Immediately afterwards, the client for the episode declares which team performed the best. The girls from winning team are granted immunity, and cannot be eliminated.

The mentors from the losing teams must nominate one girl from their team to enter the elimination room. This leaves two of the models from the two losing teams up for elimination. The mentor from the winning/Immune team gets to decide which of the two models will stay and return to her team, and which one will be eliminated. Each girl is given a chance to explain why she should be given a second chance to remain in the competition.

In instances where a mentor loses all of her contestants, the competition goes on between the two remaining teams. The winning team remains immune as usual, but the losing mentor is forced to send two girls into the elimination room as opposed to one, with only one of them returning. In rare cases, a model can also be evicted from the competition without prior warning outside of the elimination room. She could also potentially be eliminated directly by her own mentor. Elimination is problematic, even flawed: since the goal of the mentors is to win against each other, not determine who among the three teams is the very best model, mentors may eliminate the stronger model sent down to elimination, not the weaker one.

The elimination process is repeated each week until the series finale, where there is one final photo shoot and runway show with the final standing models along with their mentors. The final client (usually a beauty care or make-up brand) decides the winner from the remaining pool of contestants (usually one girl per team). The model who wins the competition becomes 'The Face' of the brand, bringing victory for her mentor and team.

The Face worldwide 
 Franchise with a currently airing season    Franchise with an upcoming season  Franchise that have ended

Winners over time

References

External links 

 Official website of The Face Australia
 Official website of The Face (UK)
 Official website of The Face (U.S.)
 Official website of The Face Thailand
 Official website of The Face Vietnam

 
Banijay franchises
Reality television series franchises